Toonumbar Dam is a minor ungated rock fill with clay core embankment dam with a concrete chute spillway across the Iron Pot Creek north-west of Casino in the Northern Rivers region of New South Wales, Australia. The dam's purpose includes hydro-power, irrigation, water supply, and conservation. The impounded reservoir is called Lake Toonumbar.

Location and features
The dam was built by Citra Australia Limited on behalf of the New South Wales Department of Land and Water Conservation to conserve water, control flows, reduce flood risk and
provide a reliable water supply in the region.

The uncontrolled concrete chute spillway is capable of discharging .

Recreation
The reservoir, Lake Toonumbar, provides a location for freshwater sports fishing for the species Australian Bass. Boat access is available at Bells Bay and near the dam wall, combustion engine powered craft are permitted to use the dam as long as the 8 knot speed limit is kept to.

Fishing
Lake Toonumbar has been stocked regularly with Australian Bass and Eastern Cod (totally protected in NSW) fingerlings. It is also known as one of the best bass fisheries on the North Coast. A NSW Fishing Licence is required to fish in the dam.

See also

List of reservoirs and dams in Australia

References

External links
 Northern Rivers Geology Blog - Toonumbar Dam

Dams completed in 1971
Dams in New South Wales
Embankment dams
Northern Rivers
Rock-filled dams